Jack Norwood Young (September 25, 1926 – September 12, 2018) was an American stunt performer and location manager who worked on many westerns and adventure movies from 1947 to 2006.

Often uncredited, his work includes Winchester '73, High Noon, Hondo, The Tall Men, The Searchers, 3:10 to Yuma, The Alamo, How The West Was Won and 70 more movies.

He also worked as a location manager on more than fifty notable movies including Joe Kidd, Tom Horn and Cannonball Run II. Young died on September 12, 2018 at the age of 91.

Filmography

References

External links

1926 births
2018 deaths
American stunt performers